Matrilineality in Judaism or matrilineal descent in Judaism is the tracing of Jewish descent through the maternal line.

Historical evidence marshalled by Professor Shaye J. D. Cohen indicates that a change from a patrilineal to a matrilineal-based principle for the offspring of mixed unions of Jew and gentile took place in the 1st century (c. 10-70 CE) times to Modern times.

Different theories try to explain the shift to matrilineality in Judaism. Some Hasidic Jewish groups propose that matrilineality and matriarchy within Judaism are related to the metaphysical concept of the Jewish soul. Conservative Jewish Theologian Rabbi Louis Jacobs suggests that the marriage practices of the Jewish community were re-stated as a law of matrilineal descent in the early Tannaitic Period (c. 10-70 CE).

Contemporary practice of Jews
The practice of matrilineal descent differs by denomination. Each denomination has protocols for conversion for those who are not Jewish by birth.

Orthodox Judaism
Orthodox Judaism practices matrilineal descent and considers it self-evident.  Orthodox Judaism holds that anyone with a Jewish mother also has irrevocable Jewish status; that even were such a Jew to convert to another religion, that person would still be considered Jewish by Jewish Law.

Conservative Judaism
The Conservative Movement also practices matrilineal descent. In 1986, the Conservative Movement's Rabbinical Assembly reiterated the commitment of the Conservative Movement to the practice of matrilineal descent. Furthermore, the movement stated that any rabbi who accepts the principle of patrilineal descent will be subject to expulsion from the Rabbinical Assembly. Still, the Conservative Movement affirmed that "sincere Jews by choice" should be warmly welcomed into the community and that "sensitivity should be shown to Jews who have intermarried and their families." The Conservative movement actively reaches out to intermarried families by offering them opportunities for Jewish growth and enrichment.

The Ratner Center for the Study of Conservative Judaism conducted a survey of 1,617 members of 27 Conservative congregations in the U.S. and Canada in 1995. 69% of respondents to the Ratner Center survey agreed that they would regard personally as a Jew anyone who was raised Jewish—even if their mother was Gentile and their father was Jewish (Wertheimer, 59). In this same survey, 29% of respondents indicated that they attended Jewish religious services twice a month or more and 13% that they engage in the study of a Jewish text once a month or more (Wertheimer, 55–57).

Reform Judaism
In 1983, the Central Conference of American Rabbis of Reform Judaism passed a resolution waiving the need for formal conversion for anyone with at least one Jewish parent, provided that either (a) one is raised as a Jew, by Reform standards, or (b) one engages in an appropriate act of public identification, formalizing a practice that had been common in Reform synagogues for at least a generation. This 1983 resolution departed from the Reform Movement's previous position requiring formal conversion to Judaism for children without a Jewish mother.

The 1983 resolution of the American Reform movement has had a mixed reception in Reform Jewish communities outside of the United States. Most notably, the Israel Movement for Reform and Progressive Judaism has rejected patrilineal descent and requires formal conversion for anyone without a Jewish mother. As well, a joint Orthodox, Traditional, Conservative and Reform Bet Din formed in Denver, Colorado to promote uniform standards for conversion to Judaism was dissolved in 1983, due to that Reform resolution. However, in 2015 the majority of Britain's Assembly of Reform Rabbis voted in favor of a position paper proposing "that individuals who live a Jewish life, and who are patrilineally Jewish, can be welcomed into the Jewish community and confirmed as Jewish through an individual process." Britain's Assembly of Reform Rabbis stated that rabbis "would be able to take local decisions – ratified by the Beit Din – confirming Jewish status."

Other movements within the World Union for Progressive Judaism also adopted essentially the same position. These include: Liberal Judaism in England; Progressive Judaism in Australia; one congregation in Austria; some congregations in Eastern Europe. Note that Reform Judaism in Canada and England adopts a different position, similar to that of Conservative Judaism (though there may be an accelerated conversion process for the children of Jewish fathers).

Karaite Judaism
Karaite Judaism does not accept Jewish Oral Law as definitive, believing that all divine commandments were recorded with their plain meaning in the written Torah. As such, they interpret the Hebrew Bible to indicate that Jewishness can only follow patrilineal descent.

The majority view in Karaite Judaism is that Jewish identity can only be transmitted by patrilineal descent. They argue that only patrilineal descent can transmit Jewish identity on the grounds that all descent in the Torah went according to the male line. Only someone who is patrilineally Jewish (someone whose father's father was Jewish) is regarded as a Jew by the Mo'eṣet HaḤakhamim, or the Karaite Council of Sages based in Israel.

Both Rabbinic and Karaite Jews lived in 12th century Egypt, and a number of marriage contracts between Karaite and Rabbinic individuals have been discovered in the Cairo Genizah. The Egyptian Karaites followed patrilineal descent, but forbade marriage with non-Jews and also did not allow converts into their community. In effect then, 12th century Egyptian Karaites required that both parents be Jewish, but they referred to this requirement as patrilineal descent. Thus, marriages between Karaites and the Rabbinic community did not violate the Rabbinate requirement of matrilineality. However, these marriages came to a halt when Maimonides (who led the Rabbinate Jewish community in Egypt in the late 12th century) prohibited them for a separate reason: while he considered Karaites Jewish, he also considered them to potentially fall within the category of mamzerut, as their divorces were not conducted according to Rabbinate standards.

Reconstructionist Judaism
Reconstructionist Judaism was the first movement to adopt the idea of bilineal descent in 1968. According to Reconstructionist Judaism, children of one Jewish parent, regardless of gender, are considered Jewish if raised as Jews.

State of Israel
The State of Israel adheres to the Jewish law of matrilineal descent for matters which could affect Israeli family law.

History and sources

Relevant Biblical sources

The Patriarchs and Matriarchs

The stories of the Patriarchs and Matriarchs in Genesis are generally compatible with matrilineal descent, if one makes the assumption that Abraham's extended family was "Jewish":
 Abraham fathered children with three wives or concubines: Sarah, Hagar, and Keturah. According to Jewish tradition, Sarah was a member of Abraham's extended family, and her descendants became Jewish. Hagar and Keturah's descendants were considered non-Jewish.
 Isaac had one wife (Rebecca, a member of Abraham's extended family) and two sons, Jacob and Esau. Jacob's descendants became Jewish. Esau's descendants were non-Jewish: assuming matrilineality, this was a result of his wives being Hittite and Ishmaelite.
 Jacob had two wives (Leah and Rachel, members of Abraham's extended family) and two concubines (Zilpah and Bilhah, who entered the family as maidservants of Leah and Rachel). All of Jacob's children were considered Jewish. As for why Zilpah and Bilhah's children were considered Jewish despite their mothers having unspecified ancestry, rabbinic sources posit that Zilpah and Bilhah were actually the half-sisters of Leah and Rachel. Alternatively, as Zilpah and Bilhah were maidservants, their children were considered to belong to their mistresses Leah and Rachel.

The stories are generally incompatible with patrilineal descent, in that Abraham and Isaac had many descendants who were not considered Jewish. However, all of Jacob's descendants were considered Jewish.

In  God refers to Hagar's son as "the son of the maidservant" rather than "your [Avraham's] son"; later rabbinic sources deduce from this that a Jewish man's child is considered "his" child only if the mother is Jewish.

The Matriarchs of Israel are the mothers of the Tribes of Israel; for those who adhere to Jewish Law, Israelite Nationhood or belonging to the Jewish People via descent exclusively follows the mother's line.

The Torah has been interpreted to suggest that a brother and sister from the same mother are more closely related than a brother and sister from just the same father (Genesis 20:12 Rashi).

Moses
Moses married Zipporah, a Midianite woman. They had two sons, Gershom and Eliezer, both born before the Exodus. The sons of Moses are absent from the genealogies of Levi, which do include the sons of Moses' brother Aaron (whose wife was Israelite).

Ruth the Moabite and Naamah the Ammonite
In the accounts of the Prophets and Writings (which covers a time period of nearly a millennium) there are two cases of non-Israelite women who voluntarily (not resulting from conflict) married Israelites where their children were considered Israelite. According to the Talmud, both of these women, Ruth and Naamah, formally converted. Both the Moabite and Ammonite nations were descended from Lot, the nephew of Abraham.

In the Book of Ruth, Naomi and her husband Elimelech were a Judean couple. Their family moved to Moab during a famine, but Elimelech died there. Naomi's two sons married Moabite women, named Ruth and Orpah. Naomi's two sons then died. Naomi and Ruth then journeyed back to Judah. Then in selling her late husband's land in Judah and the estates of her sons, Naomi set up the stipulation that her financial redeemer also marry her former daughter-in-law. The first potential redeemer declined, lest this marriage "ruin [his] inheritance". Boaz, the next of kin, became Naomi's redeemer, married Ruth and became the father of Obed, who was the ancestor of David. Ruth was the mother of Obed, but Naomi cared for the child, and their neighbors would say "A son has been born to Naomi".

Solomon "loved many foreign women". Among them was Naamah the Ammonite. Solomon and Naamah's son Rehoboam was a Judean king of the Davidic line.

Tamar, daughter of King David
Tamar, daughter of King David attempted to persuade her half-brother Amnon not to rape her, by suggesting that he could legitimately marry her instead. This suggestion is difficult to understand, as  prohibits marriage to half-siblings by either father or mother. Rashi (1040-1105 CE) attempted to resolve this problem by noting that Tamar's mother was a non-Israelite - Maacah, daughter of Talmai king of Geshur. If Jewish descent is matrilineal, and Maacah was not converted to Israelite religion at the time Tamar was conceived, then Tamar would be born non-Israelite, legally unrelated to Amnon (despite being his half-brother) and thus permitted to marry him.

Ezra
 describes how many Israelite men had intermarried with non-Jewish women, and tells the story of their renunciation of intermarriage and separation from the non-Jewish wives and from their children. The necessity of separating from the children as well as the wives suggests that the children were not considered Jewish despite having Jewish fathers. In rabbinic sources, this verse is understood to be proof of matrilinearity.

References from Hellenistic histories
The Hellenistic Jewish philosopher, Philo of Alexandria (c. 20 BCE – 50 CE) calls the child of a Jew and a non-Jew a nothos (bastard), regardless of whether the non-Jewish parent is the father or the mother.

Flavius Josephus (c. 37-100 CE), the Romanized Jewish historian, describes Antigonus II Mattathias (c. 63-37 BCE) denigrating Herod – whose father's family were Idumean Arabs forcibly converted to Judaism by John Hyrcanus and whose mother, according to Josephus, was either an Idumean Arab or Arabian (Nabatean-Arab) – by referring to him as "an Idumean i.e. a half-Jew" and as therefore unfit to be given governorship of Judea by the Romans.

Rabbinic beliefs and practices
Orthodox Judaism maintains that the law of matrilineal descent in Judaism dates at least to the time of the covenant at Sinai (c. 1310 BCE). This law was first codified in writing in the Mishna (c. 2nd century CE).

Since only "he" (a non-Jewish father) is mentioned and not "she" (a non-Jewish mother), the Talmud concludes that "your (grand)son who comes from an Israelite woman is called 'your son' (and warned about in the verse), while your (grand)son who comes from a foreign woman is not called 'your son'". Thus, Jewish descent is through the mother.

Modern views
Dr. Immanuel Jakobovits, who served as Chief Rabbi of the United Hebrew Congregations of England from 1967 to 1991, offers a possible reason for this law: “…the certainty of maternity must be set against the doubt of paternity, however small this doubt may be. In such cases Jewish law invariably invokes the rule “a doubt can never over-rule a certainty”. Jakobovits also suggests a connection between the Jewish law of matrilineal descent and a mother's bond with her child. Jakobovits writes: “It was Eve who was called so “because she was the mother of all living” (Gen. 3:20), whereas Adam was not named as “the father of all life”. Jakobovits adds, “the determination of the child’s religious status by the mother may also indicate that she has the superior influence on the child’s religious development.” 

Rabbi Louis Jacobs, who was the founder of the Masorti (Conservative) Jewish Movement in Britain and a well-known theologian writes regarding his review of an article by Professor Cohen on matrilineal descent in Judaism:There has been a development of the law in these instances from Biblical and pre-Rabbinic times. The attempt to find reasons for the change, however, has proved to be elusive and is quite unnecessary since it can be explained entirely economically by the logic of the law itself and is typical of Rabbinic thinking in general. But the development in the law had already taken place before the redaction of the Mishnah at the very latest. With the exception of the Rabbi in the Jerusalem Talmud (Qiddushin, 3:12) who permitted the child of a gentile mother and Jewish father to be circumcised on the Sabbath and whose opinion was vehemently rejected, the law is accepted unanimously in both Talmuds. It is recorded as the law in all the Codes without dissenting voice and has been the universal norm in all Jewish communities. For such a law to be changed, only the weightiest religious and ethical advantages will suffice and it is difficult indeed to discover any such in the change in this particular instance. To change this particular law would strike at the heart of the whole halakhic process and would involve a theological as well as an halakhic upheaval. And for what? The potential loss is great. The gains, if any, are few and the price is far too high.

Shaye J. D. Cohen of Harvard University and formerly a Dean at the Jewish Theological Seminary in New York City, questions the date of origin of matrilineal descent:
The preexilic portions of the Hebrew Bible are not familiar with the matrilineal principle. Numerous Israelite heroes and kings married foreign women; for example, Judah married a Canaanite, Joseph an Egyptian, Moses a Midianite and an Ethiopian, David a Philistine, and Solomon women of every description. Although Exod. 34:16 and Deut. 7:1-3 prohibit intermarriage only with the Canaanites, a prohibition that was supposed to have originated with the patriarchs Abraham (Gen. 24:3) and Isaac (Gen. 27:46-28:1), some Israelites extended the prohibition to include all foreigners (Judg. 14:3). But it never occurred to anyone in preexilic times to argue that such marriages were null and void. Marriage was the non-sacramental, private acquisition of a woman by a man, and the state had little or no legal standing in the matter. The foreign woman who married an Israelite husband was supposed to leave her gods in her father's house, but even if she did not, it never occurred to anyone to argue that her children were not Israelites. Since the idea of conversion to Judaism did not yet exist, it never occurred to anyone to demand that the foreign woman undergo some ritual to indicate her acceptance of the religion of Israel. The woman was joined to the house of Israel by being joined to her Israelite husband; the act of marriage was functionally equivalent to the later idea of conversion. In some circumstances biblical law and society did pay attention to maternal identity–the children of concubines and female slaves sometimes rank lower than the children of wives–but it never occurred to anyone to impose any legal or social disabilities on the children of foreign women.

In his review of Cohen's article, Rabbi Jacobs accepts that the law may have changed in the early Tannaitic period (circa 10-70 CE): "From the historical evidence marshalled by Professor Cohen it would appear that the change from the patrilineal to the matrilineal principle for the offspring of mixed unions of Jew and gentile took place in the early Tannaitic period."

But Jacobs dismisses Cohen's suggestion that "the Tannaim were influenced by the Roman legal system..." and contends that "even if the Rabbis were familiar with the Roman law, they might have reacted to it [instead] by preserving the patrilineal principle, holding fast to their own system."

Instead, Jacobs offers another explanation. Jacobs believes that an Israelite man who married a non-Israelite woman and had a child, that woman and child were considered not part of the "family clan" and therefore were not considered Israelite: "A child born of a Jewish father and a gentile mother cannot be given the status of the father since the patrilineal principle is stated only with regard to unions within the clan. How can the father who steps out of the clan bestow a clan status on the child whom he sires?"

Biological arguments for/against matrilineality
Some matrilineal advocates have hypothesized that DNA may carry a specific genome from the mother that transmits Judaism. However, NIH researchers have sought but found no evidence that Judaism is transmitted genetically from either the mother or the father. (In any case, converts and their descendants would not have such DNA.)

On average, humans receive more DNA from their mothers than their fathers: mitochondrial DNA is all from the mother, and the Y chromosome which is sometimes (in the case of male children) received from the father is smaller than the X chromosome which is received from the mother.

Personal and social impacts of matrilineal tradition

Personal identity and impact of matrilineal interpretation in the United States
A 2013 Pew Research Center survey shows that American children of interfaith marriages are more likely to have been raised Jewish and identify as Jewish than in the past, which some scholars attribute to more welcoming and inclusive attitudes among Jewish organizations.  The increasing awareness and social validation of self-concept as defining one's identity may also be a contributing factor.

Studies have shown that American adults whose fathers are Jewish and whose mothers are not can readily identify lasting damage to their identity formation, family relations and faith due to patrilineal rejection, regardless of whether they were raised as Jews. Experiences include being singled out and made to feel unwelcome at Jewish events, sites and schools; pressure to disguise their heritage; being bullied or isolated; uncertainty regarding their personal identity; and narrowed access to a Jewish education and a community of faith.  Ironically, it's not uncommon for interfaith families and their offspring rejected by matrilineal devotees to simultaneously suffer external discrimination on the basis of being Jews. In recent years organizations like 18 Doors  and Building Jewish Bridges have provided opportunities for families and individuals exiled by matrilineality to connect with each other and embrace their faith.

Social impacts of matrilineal interpretation 
Researcher Sergio Della Pergola found that in English-speaking countries, "the mother is the dominant parent in transmitting a group identity to the children of [intermarriages]. If the mother is Jewish, the child tends more often to be identified as Jewish, and if the mother is not Jewish, the child tends to be non-Jewish."

Progressive writers Elana Maryles Sztokman and Jessica Fishman view matrilineality as an outdated patriarchal form of control over women's bodies. Fishman labels matrilineality a fundamental denial of the right of personhood.

Legal scholar Reut Paz views matrilineality as a form of "legal privilege" for women, which offers the potential for increasing gender equality in a world where power is generally patriarchal.

See also
 Genetic studies on Jews
 Interfaith marriage in Judaism
 Who is a Jew?

References

External links
Immanuel Jakobovits, “The Timely and the Timeless”, London 1977, pp. 199–203,
Judith Olszowy-Schlanger, "Karaite Women: Permissibility of Marriage"
Louis Jacobs, "There is No Problem of Descent"
Professor Shaye J. D. Cohen, "The origin of the Matrilineal rule in Rabbinical Judaism"
Sorek, Susan. “Mothers of Israel: Why the Rabbis Adopted a Matrilineal Principle.” "Women in Judaism: A Multidisciplinary e-Journal", 2002, 
 Reform Movement's Resolution on Patrilineal Descent, March 15, 1983. "The Status of Children of Mixed Marriages"

Jewish marital law
Judaism and women
Kinship and descent